The Macedonian front, also known as the Salonica front (after Thessaloniki), was a military theatre of World War I formed as a result of an attempt by the Allied Powers to aid Serbia, in the autumn of 1915, against the combined attack of Germany, Austria-Hungary and Bulgaria. The expedition came too late and in insufficient force to prevent the fall of Serbia, and was complicated by the internal political crisis in Greece (the "National Schism"). Eventually, a stable front was established, running from the Albanian Adriatic coast to the Struma River, pitting a multinational Allied force against the Bulgarian Army, which was at various times bolstered with smaller units from the other Central Powers. The Macedonian front remained quite stable, despite local actions, until the great Allied offensive in September 1918, which resulted in the capitulation of Bulgaria and the liberation of Serbia.

Background

Following the assassination of the Crown Prince by a Bosnian Serb, Austria-Hungary had attacked Serbia in August 1914 but had failed to overcome Serbian resistance. After the entry of the Ottoman Empire into the war on the side of the Central Powers (November 1914), the decisive factor in the Balkans became the attitude of Bulgaria. Bulgaria occupied a strategically important position on the Serbian flank and its intervention on either side of the belligerents would be decisive. Bulgaria and Serbia had fought each other twice in the previous thirty years: in the Serbo-Bulgarian War of 1885 and in the Second Balkan War of 1913. Bulgaria had suffered defeat in 1913 and the Bulgarian government and people generally felt that Serbia had stolen land which rightfully belonged to Bulgaria. While the Allies could only offer Bulgaria small territorial concessions from Serbia and neutral Greece, the Central Powers' promises appeared far more enticing, as they offered to cede most of the land which Bulgaria claimed. With the Allied defeats at the Battle of Gallipoli (April 1915 to January 1916) and the Russian defeat at Gorlice-Tarnów (May to September 1915) demonstrating the Central Powers' strength, King Ferdinand signed a treaty with Germany and on 21 September 1915 Bulgaria began mobilising for war.

Triple invasion and the fall of Serbia

After the victory of the Serbian army in the Battle of Kolubara in December 1914, the Serbian front saw a lull until the early autumn of 1915. Under the command of Field Marshal August von Mackensen, the Austro-Hungarian Balkan Army, the German 11th Army and river flotillas on the Danube and the Sava began an offensive on 6 October 1915, the largest offensive against Serbia. By September 1915, despite the extreme sacrifice of the Serbian army, the Austro-Hungarian Balkan Army, having crossed the rivers Sava and Drina and the German 11th Army after crossing the Danube, occupied Belgrade, Smederevo, Požarevac and Golubac, creating a wide bridgehead south of the Sava and Danube rivers, and forcing Serbian forces to withdraw to southern Serbia.

On 15 October 1915, two Bulgarian armies attacked, over-running Serbian units, penetrating into the valley of the South Morava river near Vranje up to 22 October 1915. The Bulgarian forces occupied Kumanovo, Štip, and Skopje, and prevented the withdrawal of the Serbian army to the Greek border and Thessaloniki (Salonika).

For a year, the Allies (Britain and France) had repeatedly promised to send serious military forces to Serbia, while nothing had materialised. But with Bulgaria's mobilisation to its south, the situation for Serbia became desperate. The developments finally forced the French and the British to decide upon sending a small expedition force of two divisions from Gallipoli (156th Infantry Division (France) and 10th (Irish) Division respectively). The first troops landed in the port of Salonika on 5 October, in order to combine into an Army of the Orient under the French commander Maurice Sarrail, but even these arrived too late in the Greek port of Thessaloniki (Salonica) to have any impact in the operations to help Serbia. The main reason for the delay was the lack of available Allied forces due to the critical situation in the Western Front. The Entente used Greek neutrality as an excuse, although they could have used the Albanian coast for a rapid deployment of reinforcements and equipment during the first 14 months of the war. (As the Serbian Marshal Putnik had suggested, the Montenegrin army gave adequate cover to the Albanian coast from the north—at a safe distance from any Bulgarian advance in the south in the event of a Bulgarian intervention.) The Entente also delayed due to protracted secret negotiations aiming at bringing Bulgaria into the Allied camp, which event would have alleviated Serbia's need for Franco-British help.

In the event the lack of Allied support sealed the fate of the Serbian Army. Against Serbia the Central Powers marshalled the Bulgarian Army, a German Army, and an Austro-Hungarian Army, all under the command of Field Marshal Mackensen. The Germans and Austro-Hungarians began their attack on 7 October with a massive artillery barrage, followed by attacks across the rivers. Then, on 11 October, the Bulgarian Army attacked from two directions, one from the north of Bulgaria towards Niš, the other from the south towards Skopje (see map). The Bulgarian Army rapidly broke through the weaker Serbian forces which tried to block its advance. With the Bulgarian breakthrough, the Serbian position became hopeless; their main army in the north faced either encirclement and enforced surrender, or retreat.

Marshal Putnik ordered a full Serbian retreat, southwards and westwards through Montenegro and into Albania. The Serbs faced great difficulties: terrible weather, poor roads and the need for the army to help the tens of thousands of civilians who retreated with them. Only  soldiers reached the Adriatic coast and embarked on Italian transport ships that carried the army to Corfu and other Greek islands before it travelled on to Thessaloniki. Marshal Putnik had to be carried during the whole retreat; he died just over a year later in a French hospital.

The French and British divisions marched north from Thessaloniki in October 1915 under the joint command of French General Maurice Sarrail, and British General Bryan Mahon (Commander, British Salonika Force, 1915). However, the War Office in London was reluctant to advance too deep into Serbia. So the French divisions advanced on their own up the Vardar River. This advance gave some limited help to the retreating Serbian Army, as the Bulgarians had to concentrate larger forces on their southern flank to deal with the threat, which led to the Battle of Krivolak (October–November 1915). By the end of November, General Sarrail had to retreat in the face of massive Bulgarian assaults on his positions. During his retreat, the British at Kosturino were also forced to retreat. By 12 December, all allied forces were back in Greece. The Germans ordered the Bulgarians not to cross the Greek borders, reluctant to risk a Greek entry into the war in response to a Bulgarian invasion in Macedonia. The Allies for their part took advantage of that, reinforcing and consolidating their positions behind the borders.

Thus there resulted a clear, albeit incomplete victory for the Central Powers. As a consequence they opened the railway line from Berlin to Constantinople, allowing Germany to prop up its weaker partner, the Ottoman Empire. Despite the Central Powers' victory, the Allies managed to save a part of the Serbian Army, which although battered, seriously reduced and almost unarmed, escaped total destruction and after reorganising resumed operations six months later. And most damagingly for the Central Powers, the Allies—using the moral excuse of saving the Serbian Army—managed to replace the impossible Serbian front with a viable one established in Macedonia (albeit by violating the territory of an officially neutral country); a front which would prove key to their final victory three years later.

Establishment of the Macedonian front

On 5 January 1916, the Austro-Hungarian Army attacked Serbia's ally Montenegro. The small Montenegrin army offered strong resistance in the Battle of Mojkovac, which greatly helped the withdrawal of the Serbian Army, but soon faced impossible odds and was compelled to surrender on 25 January. The Austro-Hungarians advanced down the coast of the Adriatic Sea into Italian-controlled Albania. By the end of the winter, the small Italian army in Albania had been forced out of nearly the whole country. At this point, with the war in the Balkans almost lost, the British General Staff wanted to withdraw all British troops from Greece, but the French government protested strongly and the troops remained. The Allied armies entrenched around Thessaloniki, which became a huge fortified camp, earning themselves the mocking nickname "the Gardeners of Salonika". The Serbian Army (now under the command of General Petar Bojović), after rest and refit on Corfu, was transported by the French to the Macedonian front.

In the meantime, the political situation in Greece was confused. Officially, Greece was neutral, but King Constantine I was pro-German, while Prime Minister Eleftherios Venizelos was pro-Allied. Venizelos invited the Entente into Thessaloniki.

With knowledge that Romania was about to join the Allied side, General Sarrail began preparations for an attack on the Bulgarian armies facing his forces. The Germans made plans of their own for a "spoiling attack". The German offensive was launched on 17 August, just three days before the French offensive was scheduled to start. In reality, this was a Bulgarian offensive, as the Austro-Hungarian Army was in Albania and only one German division was on the Greek border. The Bulgarians attacked on two fronts. In the east, they easily conquered all Greek territory east of the river Struma (see Struma Offensive), since the Greek Army was ordered not to resist by the pro-German King Constantine. In the west, the attack achieved early success thanks to surprise but the Allied forces held a defensive line after two weeks. Having halted the Bulgarian offensive, the Allies staged a counter-attack starting on 12 September (Battle of Kaymakchalan). The terrain was rough and the Bulgarians were on the defensive but the Allied forces made steady gains. Slow advances by the Allies continued throughout October and on into November, even as the weather turned very cold and snow fell on the hills. The Germans sent two more divisions to help bolster the Bulgarian Army but by 19 November the French and Serbian Army captured Kaymakchalan, the highest peak of Nidže mountain, and compelled the Central powers to abandon Bitola to the Entente;  Bulgarians and Germans were killed, wounded or captured. The Allies suffered c. 50,000 battle casualties but another 80,000 men died or were evacuated due to sickness.

The unopposed Bulgarian advance into Greek-held eastern Macedonia precipitated a crisis in Greece. The royalist government ordered its troops in the area (the demobilised IV Corps) not to resist and to retreat to the port of Kavala for evacuation, but no naval vessels turned up to permit the evacuation to take place. Despite occasional local resistance from a few officers and their nucleus units, most of the troops, along with their commander, surrendered to a token German force and were interned for the remainder of the war at Görlitz, Germany. The surrender of territory recently won with difficulty in the Second Balkan War of 1913 was the last straw for many Venizelist army officers. With Allied assistance, they launched a coup which secured Thessaloniki and most of Greek Macedonia for Venizelos. From that point Greece had two governments: the "official" royal government at Athens, which maintained Greek neutrality, and the "revolutionary" Venizelist "Provisional Government of National Defence" at Thessaloniki. At the same time, the Italians had deployed more forces to Albania and these new troops managed to push the Austrian corps back through very hilly country south of Lake Ostrovo.

1917

By spring 1917, General Sarrail's Allied Army of the Orient had been reinforced to  six French, six Serbian, seven British, one Italian, three Greek and two Russian brigades. An offensive was planned for late April but the initial attack failed with major losses and the offensive was called off on 21 May. The Venizelists and the Entente, wishing to exert more pressure on Athens, occupied Thessaly, which had been evacuated by the royalists, and the Isthmus of Corinth, dividing the country. After an attempt to occupy Athens by force, which caused the reaction of the local royalist forces and ended in a fiasco in December (see Noemvriana), the Allies established a naval blockade around southern Greece which was still loyal to King Constantine, causing extreme hardship to the people in those areas. Six months later in June, the Venizelists presented an ultimatum, resulting in the exile of the Greek king (on 14 June, his son Alexander became king) and the reunification of the country under Venizelos. The new government immediately declared war on the Central Powers and created a new Army.

1918

Opposing forces in the middle of September

Central Powers

Entente

Military operations

On 30 May 1918, the Allies launched an offensive on the heavily fortified Skra salient, commencing the battle of Skra-di-Legen.
The battle marked the first major Greek action on the Allied side in the war. Utilizing the cover of heavy artillery a Franco-Hellenic force made a rapid push into the enemy trenches, conquering Skra and the surrounding system of fortifications. Greek casualties amounted to 434–440 killed in action, 154–164 missing in action and 1,974–2,220 wounded, France lost approximately 150 men killed or injured. A total of 1,782 soldiers of the Central Powers became prisoners of war, including a small number of German engineers and artillery specialists that served in Bulgarian units; considerable amounts of military equipment also fell into Entente hands. The plan for a Bulgarian counterattack against Skra remained unfulfilled as the Bulgarian soldiers refused to take part in the operation. Both the Greek and the French press used the opportunity to extol the efforts of the Greek army, favourably influencing the Greek mobilisation.

The fall of Skra prompted Bulgarian prime minister Vasil Radoslavov to resign on 21 June 1918. Aleksandar Malinov who assumed office immediately afterwards pursued secret negotiations with Britain, offering Bulgaria's exit from the war with the condition that Bulgaria fully retain eastern Macedonia. However, British prime minister David Lloyd George rejected the proposal, assuring the Greek ambassador in London Ioannis Gennadius, that Britain would not act against Greek interests.

With the German spring offensive threatening France, Guillaumat was recalled to Paris and replaced by General Franchet d'Esperey. Although d'Esperey urged an attack on the Bulgarian Army, the French government refused to allow an offensive unless all the countries agreed. General Guillaumat, no longer needed in France, travelled from London to Rome, trying to win approval for an attack. Finally in September, agreement was reached and d'Esperey was allowed to launch his grand offensive.

The Allied forces were now large, despite the Russian exit from the war due to the Treaty of Brest-Litovsk in March 1918. Greece and its army (nine divisions) were fully committed to the Entente, while 6,000 Czech and Slovak former prisoners of war held on the Italian front were re-armed, re-organized, and transferred to the Macedonian front to fight for the Entente. The Bulgarians had also increased their army during 1917, and in total manpower, the two sides were roughly equal  battalions vs.  battalions, plus ten German battalions). However, as 1918 progressed, it was clear that the Entente had momentum the Central Powers lacked. Russian defeat had yielded no meaningful benefit to the Central Powers. The Ottoman Empire faced progressive loss of Arab lands. In Austria-Hungary, non-German and non-Hungarian parts of the multinational empire grew more openly restive. On the Western Front, intense German spring offensives had not defeated France, while American deployment was increasingly effective, with US forces operating under independent command from June 1918. Though Bulgaria and the United States were not at war with each other, German victory over the United States appeared conceptually infeasible. Finally, and most importantly for Bulgaria, almost all of its territorial war aims were already achieved, but as World War I was not merely a third Balkan War, Bulgaria could not quit. Alongside its partners, Bulgaria continued to suffer high casualties and civilian privation, including food shortages, seemingly to achieve the unrealized objectives of its allies. As a constitutional monarchy, Bulgaria depended on the consent of its people to keep fighting, while stress and discontent with the war grew.

The preparatory artillery bombardment of Bulgarian and Central Powers positions for the Battle of Dobro Pole began on 14 September. The following day, the French and Serbians attacked and captured their objective. On 18 September, the Greeks and the British attacked but were stopped with heavy losses by the Bulgarians in the Battle of Doiran. The Franco-Serbian army continued advancing vigorously and next day, some Bulgarian units started surrendering positions without a fight and the Bulgarian command ordered a retreat.

In the official British government history of the Macedonian campaign, Cyril Falls wrote a detailed analysis of the situation of the Bulgarian forces and the situation of the front. Although a breakthrough was achieved at Dobro Pole and the allied forces continued their advance, the Bulgarian army was not routed and managed an orderly retreat. By 29 September (a day before Bulgaria exited World War I), Skopje fell but a strong Bulgarian and German force had been ordered to try and retake it the next day; the number of Bulgarian prisoners-of-war in allied hands around that day was only 

Another major factor contributed to the Bulgarian request for an armistice. A mass of retreating Bulgarian mutineers had converged on the railway centre of Radomir in Bulgaria, just  from the capital city of Sofia. On 27 September, leaders of the Bulgarian Agrarian National Union took control of these troops and proclaimed the overthrow of the monarchy and a Bulgarian republic. About  rebellious troops threatened Sofia the next day. Under those chaotic circumstances a Bulgarian delegation arrived in Thessaloniki to ask for an armistice. On 29 September, the Bulgarians were granted the Armistice of Salonica by General d'Esperey, ending their war. The Macedonian front was brought to an end at noon on 30 September 1918 when the ceasefire came into effect. The Soldiers' Uprising was finally put down by 2 October.

German Emperor Wilhelm II in his telegram to Bulgarian Tsar Ferdinand I stated: “Disgraceful! 62,000 Serbs decided the war!" On 29 September 1918, the German Supreme Army Command informed Wilhelm II and the Imperial Chancellor Count Georg von Hertling, that the military situation facing Germany was hopeless. Ferdinand I abdicated and went into exile on 3 October.

The British Army headed east towards the European side of the Ottoman Empire, while the French and Serbian forces continued north and liberated Serbia, Albania and Montenegro. The British Army neared Constantinople and with no serious Ottoman forces to stop it the Ottoman government asked for an armistice (the Armistice of Mudros) on 26 October; Enver Pasha and his partners had fled several days earlier to Berlin. The Serbo-French Army re-captured Serbia and overran several weak German divisions that tried to block its advance near Niš. On 3 November Austria-Hungary was forced to sign an armistice on the Italian front and the war there ended. On 10 November, d'Esperey's army crossed the Danube river and was poised to enter the heartland of Hungary. At the request of the French general, Count Károlyi, leading the Hungarian government, came to Belgrade and signed another armistice, the Armistice of Belgrade.

Memorials

Memorials erected in the area include the Doiran Memorial to the dead of the British Salonika Army.

Gallery

Annotations

References

Bibliography

Further reading
 

 
 
 
 
 
 
 
 
 

 
European theatre of World War I
Campaigns and theatres of World War I
Albania in World War I
Bulgaria in World War I
Greece in World War I
Serbia in World War I
Modern history of Greek Macedonia
Modern history of the Balkans
Vardar Macedonia (1912–1918)
Wars involving the Balkans
Military campaigns and theatres of World War I involving the Ottoman Empire
Battle honours of the King's Royal Rifle Corps
Military history of Thessaloniki